Nandita Das is an Indian actress and film maker. She has acted in over 40 feature films in ten different languages. Das appeared in the films Fire (1996), Earth (1998), Bawandar (2000), Kannathil Muthamittal (2002), Azhagi (2002), Kamli (2006), and Before The Rains (2007). Her directorial debut Firaaq (2008), premiered at the Toronto Film Festival and travelled to more than 50 festivals, winning more than 20 awards. Her second film as a director was Manto (2018). Based on the life of 20th Century Indo-Pakistani short story writer Sadat Hasan Manto, the film was screened at Cannes Film Festival in the "Un Certain Regard" section. In September 2019, Das produced a two-minute Public Service Announcement music video India's Got Colour. The music video is about the issue of colourism and urges the audience to celebrate India's diversity of skin colour. Her first book, 'Manto & I', chronicles her 6-year long journey of making the film. She wrote, directed, produced and acted in a short film called, Listen to Her, that sheds light on the increase in domestic violence and overburden of work that women have been facing during the lockdown.
Also sought petition seeking the commutation of the death sentence handed out to Ajmal Kasab.

Das has served twice on the jury of the Cannes Film Festival. In 2005, she served on the main competition jury alongside Fatih Akin, Javier Bardem, Salma Hayek, Benoît Jacquot, Emir Kusturica, Toni Morrison, Agnès Varda, and John Woo. In 2013, she served on the Cinéfondation and short films jury with Jane Campion, Maji-da Abdi, Nicoletta Braschi, and Semih Kaplanoğlu.

In 2011, she was made Chevalier de l'Ordre des Arts et des Lettres (Knight of the Order of Arts and Letters) by the French Government, one of the nation's highest civilian awards. She was commended for her "contribution towards the development of Indo-French cooperation in the field of cinema." In 2009, France released a stamp featuring Das, from artist Titouan Lamazou's project "Women of the World."

Das was the first Indian inducted into the International Hall of Fame of the International Women's Forum in Washington, DC. She was recognized in 2011 for "her sustained contributions to the arts and to the world as one of the most gripping cinema arts leaders of our time." Her fellow inductees were Anna Fendi, Heidi Klum, and Madam Chen Zhili.

Early life and education
Das' father is the artist Jatin Das, and her mother is Varsha Das, a writer. She was born in Mumbai and grew up mostly in Delhi in an Odia family, where she attended the Sardar Patel Vidyalaya school. She received bachelor's degree in Geography from Miranda House and Master of Social Work from the Delhi School of Social Work, both affiliated with the University of Delhi.

Das was a Yale World Fellow in 2014. She was one of 16 emerging global leaders chosen from nearly 4000 applicants.

She has also taught at the Rishi Valley School.

Career

Acting
Das has acted in over 40 feature films with directors such as Mrinal Sen, Adoor Gopalakrishnan, Shyam Benegal, Deepa Mehta, and Mani Ratnam. She began her acting career with the street theatre group Jana Natya Manch. She is best known for her performances in director Deepa Mehta films Fire (1996) and Earth (1998; alongside Aamir Khan), Bawander (directed by Jagmohan Mundhra), and Naalu Pennungal (directed by Adoor Gopalakrishnan ). She has also acted in the movie Before the Rains, an Indian-British period drama film directed by Santosh Sivan.She has acted in films in ten different languages: English, Hindi, Bengali, Malayalam, Tamil, Telugu, Urdu, Marathi, Odia, and Kannada. The Tamil actor Sukanya provided Das' speaking voice in the Tamil classic Kannathil Muthamittal.

Das co-wrote, directed and acted in a play called Between the Lines (2014). She has also acted in Khamosh! Adalat jaari hai (2017), a Cineplay production written by Vijay Tendulkar.

Direction
In 2008, she directed her first film, Firaaq. The film is a work of fiction "based on a thousand true stories" and is set a month after the 2002 Gujarat riots in India. It is an ensemble film that interweaves multiple stories over a 24-hour period, as the characters from different strata of society, grapple with the lingering effects of violence. Das said that the film "gave a voice to so much that remains silent". In 2018, Nandita directed Manto. Das decided to make a film on Manto after reading a translation of his stories in 2012. She always had Nawazuddin Siddiqui in mind for the role and approached him for the same. The film was premiered in Cannes Film Festival in 2018. The film was also screened at Toronto International Film Festival. In 2019 Das produced and directed a PSA music video, 'India's Got Colour'. Her third directorial venture Zwigato explores the life of a food delivery rider and his family, starring Kapil Sharma and Shahana Goswami in the lead roles. The film is also produced by her company NDI, in collaboration with Applause Entertainment. Zwigato was released in India on 17th March 2023.

Voice narration
Das narrated the children's audiobook series Under the Banyan, and Mahatma Gandhi's autobiography by Charkha Audiobooks, The Story of My Experiments with Truth. She was also a voice actor in the children's television series Wonder Pets, as the Bengal Tiger in the episode Save the Bengal Tiger (2007).

She also sang the song Ramleela for the movie Aks and Jagya Sarsi for the movie Bawandar.

Listen to Her
During the pandemic, in May 2020, she wrote, directed and acted in a short film called, Listen to Her. The 7 min film, produced by Nandita Das Initiatives, is about the increase in domestic violence and overburden of work that women are facing during the lock-down. It was supported by UNESCO, UNFPA, UNICEF, UN Women and South Asia Foundation.

Personal life 
In 2002, Das married Saumya Sen. The couple began Leapfrog, a media organisation geared towards making socially conscious ad films. The couple divorced in 2007. After dating Subodh Maskara, a Mumbai industrialist, for a couple of months, she married him on 2 January 2010 and moved to Mumbai. Das and Maskara have a son named Vihaan. In January 2017, the couple announced that they have parted ways.

Nandita Das is an atheist. She claims she has no religious affiliation -- "If I aligned with anything it would probably be Buddhism," she said.

Activism

Das has master's degree in Social Work from the University of Delhi. She has worked for children's rights, HIV/AIDS awareness, to end violence against women. In 2009, Das was appointed Chairperson of the Children's Film Society of India. In 2012, she was the guest of honour at the iVolunteer Awards, held in Mumbai. Das also donated to the launch of the investigative journalism magazine Tehelka, founded by Tarun Tejpal.

India's Got Colour (Dark is Beautiful) campaign 
In 2013, Das became the face of the "Dark is Beautiful" campaign. Launched by Women of Worth in 2009, the campaign aims to draw attention to the effects of discrimination based on skin color in India. The campaign urges women and men to celebrate the beauty and diversity of all skin tones, using slogans such as "Stay UNfair, Stay Beautiful." Das said in 2014: In the [Indian film] industry a makeup man or a cinematographer would come and say can you lighten your skin a little, especially when you are playing the middle class educated character. In 2019, the Campaign was reinvented as India’s Got Colour. Along with Mahesh Mathai, Nandita Das has produced and co-directed a two-minute PSA for the campaign. The music video features several eminent artists from the Indian Film Industry.

Speaking engagements
Das has been a featured speaker at various platforms in India and abroad, including at MIT (in 2007, after a screening of Fire), and at Tufts University (in 2014, on gender in society and cinema).

In 2016, she gave a TEDx talk at TEDxWalledCity on "The Biggest Hypocrisy of Our Times: Our Attitude to Poverty." In 2011, she spoke at TEDxNarimanPoint, on "Transformation in Education".

In 2019. she gave a Tedx talk at TEDxShivNadarUniversity about A Mother's Journey With Anger

Accolades 

In August 2018 Power Brands awarded Nandita Das the Bharatiya Manavata Vikas Puraskar for being a polymath with purpose, advocating issues of communal harmony, peace and social justice, especially for women, children and the marginalized "others"  through various platforms, for her expressions of courage and compassion on celluloid and her steadfast faith in the power of cinema effecting social change for a better world.

For acting

For directing

Filmography

Actor

Director

Bibliography 

 Manto and I. Aleph Book Company.

References

External links

 
 
 Dark is Beautiful
Interview 2003

Living people
Year of birth missing (living people)
Actresses from Mumbai
Film directors from Mumbai
Screenwriters from Mumbai
Women writers from Maharashtra
Actresses from Delhi
Delhi University alumni
Indian film actresses
Indian women film directors
Indian women screenwriters
Hindi-language film directors
Chevaliers of the Ordre des Arts et des Lettres
Filmfare Awards winners
Nandi Award winners
Tamil Nadu State Film Awards winners
Odia people
Actresses in Hindi cinema
Actresses in Kannada cinema
Actresses in Bengali cinema
Actresses in Tamil cinema
Actresses in Malayalam cinema
Actresses in Urdu cinema
Actresses in Odia cinema
Actresses in Marathi cinema
Actresses in Telugu cinema
Actresses in Gujarati cinema
Indian atheists
Indian expatriates in Spain
Indian expatriate actresses in Pakistan
20th-century Indian actresses
21st-century Indian actresses
20th-century Indian film directors
21st-century Indian film directors